Ranger was launched in 1791 in New Providence and immediately came to Britain. She generally traded between Liverpool and New Providence. She underwent grounding in 1795 and in 1796 her owners had her repaired, lengthened, and converted from a brig to a ship. A French privateer captured her in August 1797 after a single-ship action. In a process that is currently obscure, Ranger returned to British ownership circa 1799. She then became a West Indiaman. From 1803 on she became a Liverpool-based slave ship in the triangular trade in enslaved people. She made one complete slave trading voyage. Then French privateers captured her after she had embarked slaves in West Africa but before she could deliver them to the West Indies. A United States citizen purchased her at Guadeloupe and renamed her Delaware. In 1805 the Royal Navy recaptured her. She was returned to her British owners who sailed her between Ireland and Newfoundland. She was last listed in 1814.

Career
Ranger first appeared in Lloyd's Register (LR) in 1791.

After the outbreak of war with France, Captain John Walker acquired a letter of marque on 16 May 1793. This was short lived. In 1794 Ranger had a new master who did not acquire a letter of marque, and a much reduced armament.

In November 1795 Lloyd's List reported that Ranger, Jump, master, had gone on shore at the Isle of Man. She was on her way from Liverpool to Lisbon.

Capture
Lloyd's List reported in December 1797 that on 25 August 1797 a French privateer had captured Ranger, from Liverpool and New Providence to the Caicos, and taken her into Cape Francois. Captain Bell was killed in the two-hour engagement before Ranger struck.

In a process that is currently obscure, Ranger returned to British ownership circa 1799. She reappeared in the 1799 volume of Lloyd's Register.

New owners in Liverpool put Ranger into the slave trade. 

1st slave voyage (1803–1804): Captain Thomas Phillips sailed from Liverpool on 28 April 1803. He acquired a letter of marque on 2 August 1803. Ranger acquired her slaves at Calabar. On 13 October she arrived at Trinidad with 189 slaves. Phillips died on the voyage, probably before Ranger arrived at Trinidad. She left Trinidad for Liverpool on 1 December and arrived back there on 27 January 1804 with Elliot Arthy, master. She had left Liverpool wit 24 crew members and had suffered no crew deaths on her voyage.

2nd slave voyage (1804–loss): Captain Archibald Holmes sailed from Liverpool on 29 April 1804.

Capture
In June 1805 Lloyd's List reported that two privateers had captured Ranger, Holmes, master, to the windward of Barbados. The privateers sent Ranger into Guadeloupe.

Delaware
Francis Bruel, a United States citizen purchased Ranger in Guadeloupe and renamed her Delaware. On 17 November 1805  captured Delaware, George Pickle, master, some 10 miles from Guadeloupe as Delaware was sailing from Philadelphia to Guadeloupe. Pickle protested the capture, arguing that Delaware was a neutral vessel. The Vice admiralty court at Antigua on 16 December rejected the appeal. Documents submitted during the court case revealed that Delaware had been Ranger. Ranger was returned to her British owners.

Ranger

Fate
Ranger was last listed in Lloyd's Register in the volume for 1814, but with data unchanged since 1808.

Citations

References

1791 ships
Ships built in the Bahamas
Maritime incidents in 1795
Captured ships
Age of Sail merchant ships of England
Liverpool slave ships
Age of Sail merchant ships of the United States